Anton Janson (January 17, 1620 in Wanden/Wauden? in Friesland – November 18, 1687 in Leipzig) was a Dutch type founder and printer.

The typeface Janson is named after him, although it can also be attributed to Hungarian punch-cutter and printer Miklós (Nicholas) Kis (1650–1702).

References
Carter, Rob, Day, Ben, Meggs, Philip. Typographic Design: Form and Communication, Second Edition. Van Nostrand Reinhold, Inc: 1993 .
Meggs, Philip B. and McKelvey, Roy. Revival of the Fittest: Digital Versions of Classic Typefaces. RC Publications: 2000. .
Molnár, József. Misztótfalusi Kis Miklós. Európai Protestáns Szabadegyetem: 2000. .

1620 births
1687 deaths
Dutch typographers and type designers
Dutch graphic designers
People from Friesland